Mario Vega (born 1958) is a Christian Pentecostal pastor, leader of the Misión Cristiana Elim Internacional, a megachurch in San Salvador, El Salvador. He is married to Cecilia de Vega, with whom he has a son.

Biography 

Mario Vega was born in San Salvador, El Salvador, in 1958. He is brought up in a respectful Catholic family. On January 19, 1975, at 17, he visited, an evangelical church for the first time, La Peña de Horeb in Soyapango, with his cousin. A week later, on January 26, he decided to give his life to Jesus. Sometime later, he finishes high school and he answers the call of the ministry, despite the misunderstanding of his family, which sees this as an outlet for those who have not succeeded.

Ministry 
On April 13, 1980, at the age of 22, Mario Vega was sent to Santa Ana for a church of the Misión Cristiana Elim Internacional.  In July, he was ordained pastor by Sergio Daniel Solórzano Aldana.
In 1997, Mario Vega became senior pastor of Misión Cristiana Elim Internacional, San Salvador. He is considered as a resource person to shed light on certain social issues. It is also involved in the fight against poverty by setting up concrete programs with the Church; Training in employment, environmental education, testing for HIV.

See also 
 Misión Cristiana Elim Internacional

References 

Content in this edit is translated from the existing Spanish Wikipedia article at :es:Mario Vega; see its history for attribution.

1958 births
Living people
Evangelical pastors
Salvadoran evangelicals
People from San Salvador